Return to Departure: The Biography of a Painting (or, Watching a Pigment Dry and Other Realisms) is a Canadian documentary film, directed by Kirk Tougas and released in 1986. The film centres on painter Chi O'Farrell, documenting his process from start to finish of creating his painting "Return to Departure", against a soundtrack consisting largely of radio talk and music with some narration by O'Farrell about his own thoughts on the painting.

The film received a Genie Award nomination for Best Feature Length Documentary at the 8th Genie Awards in 1987.

References

External links
 

1986 films
1986 documentary films
Canadian documentary films
National Film Board of Canada documentaries
Documentary films about painters
English-language Canadian films
1980s English-language films
1980s Canadian films